The Hare Krishna mantra, also referred to reverentially as the  ("Great Mantra"), is a 16-word Vaishnava mantra which is mentioned in the Kali-Santarana Upanishad and which from the 15th century rose to importance in the Bhakti movement following the teachings of Chaitanya Mahaprabhu. This mantra is composed of three Sanskrit names – "Krishna", "Rama", and "Hare".

Since the 1960s, the mantra has been made well known outside India by A. C. Bhaktivedanta Swami Prabhupada and his movement, International Society for Krishna Consciousness (commonly known as the "Hare Krishnas" or the Hare Krishna movement).

Mantra
The Hare Krishna mantra is composed of Sanskrit names: Hare, Krishna, and Rama (in Anglicized spelling). It is a poetic stanza in  meter (a quatrain of four lines of eight syllables with certain syllable lengths for some of the syllables).

The mantra as rendered in the oldest extant written source, the Kali-Saṇṭāraṇa Upaniṣad, is as follows:

When followers of Sri Krishna Chaitanya Mahaprabhu teach and practice the Mahamantra, it is rendered with the name Krishna first. So the followers of Chaitanya Mahaprabhu read it as 

Pronunciation of mantra in IPA (Sanskrit):

This mantra has multiple interpretations, all of which may be considered as correct. "Hare" can be interpreted as the vocative form of Hari, another name of Vishnu meaning "he who removes illusion". According to A. C. Bhaktivedanta Swami Prabhupada,  refers to "the energy/shakti of Supreme Personality of Godhead" while Krishna and Rama refer to Supreme Godhead himself, meaning "He who is All-Attractive" and "He who is the Source of All Pleasure". In the hymn  spoken by Bhishma in praise of Krishna after the Kurukshetra War, Krishna is also called Rama.

It is sometimes believed that "Rama" in "Hare Rama" means "Radharamana" or the beloved of Radha (another name for Kṛṣṇa). The more common interpretation is that Rāma refers to Rama of the Ramayana, an earlier avatar of Krishna. "Rama can also be a shortened form of Balarama, Krishna's first expansion." The mantra is repeated, either sung out loud (bhajan), congregationally (kirtan), or to oneself aloud or mentally on prayer beads made of Tulasi (japa). A. C. Bhaktivedanta Swami describes the process of chanting the Maha Mantra as follows:

History

In this Upanishad, Narada is instructed by Brahma (in the translation of K. N. Aiyar):

Narada asks to be told this name of Narayana, and Brahma replies:

Emic tradition claims that the mantra was popularized by Chaitanya Mahaprabhu roughly around 1500 A.D. when he began his mission to spread Harinam publicly to "every town and village" in the world, traveling throughout India, and especially within the areas of Bengal and Odisha. Some versions of the Kali Santarana Upanishad give the mantra with Hare Rama preceding Hare Krishna (as quoted above), and others with Hare Krishna preceding Hare Rama, as in Navadvipa version of the manuscript. The latter format is by far the more common within the Vaishnava traditions. It is a common belief that the mantra is equally potent when spoken in either order.

A. C. Bhaktivedanta Swami Prabhupada, a devotee of Krishna in disciplic succession, on the order of his guru, Srila Bhaktisiddhanta Sarasvati, brought the teachings of Sri Chaitanya from Bharat (India) and single-handedly took the responsibility of spreading them around the Western world. Beginning in New York City 1965, he encircled the globe fourteen times in the final eleven years of his life, thus making 'Hare Krishna' a well-known phrase in many parts of the world.

Popular culture

The Hare Krishna mantra appears in a number of famous songs, notably those of George Harrison. His first solo single "My Sweet Lord" topped charts around the world in 1970–71. Harrison put a Hare Krishna sticker on the back of the headstock of Eric Clapton's 1964 Gibson ES-335; the sticker also appears on Gibson's 2005 reproduction of the guitar.

Produced by Harrison, Radha Krishna Temple's recording "Hare Krishna Mantra" was issued as a single on the Beatles' Apple record label in 1969. The single was a commercial success, peaking at number 12 in the UK, and led to the Temple devotees appearing on the popular British music chart television programme Top of the Pops.

The Broadway musical Hair has a song, "Hare Krishna", containing the mantra, along with some additional lyrics.

The mantra also prominently appears in Jesus Loves You's "Bow Down Mister" (1990) and in the Pretenders' "Boots of Chinese Plastic" from their 2008 album, Break Up the Concrete. Stevie Wonder used the devotees chanting Hare Krishna in his song "Pastime Paradise".

Less well-known recordings of the Hare Krishna mantra include versions by the Fugs on their 1968 album Tenderness Junction (featuring poet Allen Ginsberg), by Nina Hagen, in multiple songs by English psychedelic rock band Quintessence (produced by John Barham, a frequent collaborator of George Harrison) and by Hüsker Dü on their 1984 album Zen Arcade. Kula Shaker, Boy George, and members of the Rubettes have recorded music tracks about Krishna Consciousness.

In a 2010 experimental study involving both devotees and non-devotees, singing vowels like "ah" and "eh" was found to be more joyful than singing vowels like "oh" and "uh", possibly due to a facial feedback effect.

Scriptural references
The practice of chanting the Hare Krishna mantra is recommended in the Puranas, the Pancharatra, and throughout Vaishnava literature in general. For example:

See also

Om Namo Bhagavate Vasudevaya
Haridasa Thakur
Kali-Saṇṭāraṇa Upaniṣad
Svayam Bhagavan
Vaishnavism
Vrindavan

Footnotes

Sources

External links

Hindu denominations
Hindu mantras
Krishna
Meditation
Vaishnavism
Kirtan